The Bishop of Romblon is the Ordinary of the Roman Catholic Diocese of Romblon in the Ecclesiastical Province of Capiz, Philippines. The current bishop is Narciso Abellana y Villaver. The local church of the Diocese of Romblon has shown tremendous growth since its erection in April 1974.  Although the local situation is characterized by massive poverty because a majority of its people are poor fisher folk and marginalized farmers, the resources and strength of the Romblomanons, as the native inhabitants are called, have come to the fore to solve the vital problems that beset the diocese.

Romblon is a province composed of 20 islands and islets surrounded by deep waters in the Western Visayas region known as Region IV.  Its three main islands – Tablas, Sibuyan and Romblon lie between the western tip of Panay Island and the end of the Bondoc Peninsula in Luzon.  The Sibuyan Sea surrounds and separates them from the mainland of Luzon and the rest of the Visayas.

Bishops of Romblon

See also
Catholic Church in the Philippines

References

Roman Catholic bishops of Romblon
Religion in Romblon